When I Grow Up may refer to:

Film and television 
 "When I Grow Up...", an episode of Barney & Friends
 When I Grow Up (film), a 1951 film starring Bobby Driscoll
 When I Grow Up, a 2008 film by Michael Ferns

Literature 
 When I Grow Up (webcomic), a webcomic by Jeffrey Rowland
 When I Grow up: A Memoir, a 2008 book by Juliana Hatfield
 When I Grow Up, a 2011 children's book by "Weird Al" Yankovic

Songs 
 "When I Grow Up" (Fever Ray song), 2009
 "When I Grow Up" (Garbage song), 1999
 "When I Grow Up" (Matilda), from Matilda the Musical, 2011
 "When I Grow Up" (NF song), 2019
 "When I Grow Up" (The Pussycat Dolls song), 2008
 "When I Grow Up (To Be a Man)", by the Beach Boys, 1964
 "When I Grow Up", by Clint Daniels, 1998
 "When I Grow Up", by Michelle Shocked from Short Sharp Shocked, 1988